"Popular" (stylized as "Pop!ular") is a song from Australian singer-songwriter Darren Hayes' second solo album, The Tension and the Spark (2004). The lyrics are a tongue-in-cheek send-up of celebrities and wannabes. A radio edit was made which omits the instrumental section after the second chorus and also adds several new drumbeats to the second verse. The song was released in Australia on 12 July 2004.

Along with "Insatiable", "Pop!ular" is Hayes' highest-charting solo single in Australia, peaking at number three on the ARIA Singles Chart. In the United States, the song reached the top of the Billboard Hot Dance Club Play chart in March 2005, becoming Hayes' first single to top the chart as either a solo artist or with his former group, Savage Garden. A video was later released, showing Darren Hayes and two scantily clad models visiting various landmarks in London. A flash mob dance also takes place in one of the stations in London (Marylebone station).

Track listings
Australia CD1
 "Pop!ular" (radio edit) – 3:44
 "Touch" – 4:41
 "Zero" – 4:56
 "Pop!ular" (DP Rich Bitch Mix) – 4:57

Australia CD2 – The Remixes
 "Pop!ular" (album version) – 3:53
 "Pop!ular" (Jason Nevins Global Club Mix) – 6:18
 "Pop!ular" (Almighty Remix) – 7:37
 "Pop!ular" (Johnny Budz Extended Mix) – 5:05
 "Pop!ular" (Guido Osario Club Mix) – 6:11

UK CD1
 "Pop!ular" (album version) – 3:53
 "Pop!ular" (Almighty Remix Radio Edit) – 4:00

UK CD2
 "Pop!ular" (album version) – 3:53
 "Pop!ular" (Wayne G's Heaven Anthem Mix) – 9:18
 "Zero" – 4:56
 "Pop!ular" (CD-ROM video)

Charts

Weekly charts

Year-end charts

Certifications

Release history

See also
 List of number-one dance singles of 2005 (U.S.)

References

External links
 Darren Hayes – "Pop!ular" music video
 Darren Hayes' official site

2004 singles
2004 songs
Columbia Records singles
Darren Hayes songs
Music videos shot in London
Songs about fame
Songs written by Darren Hayes
Songs written by Robert Conley (music producer)